William Dix may refer to:

William Chatterton Dix (1837–1898), British composer
William S. Dix (1910–1978), Princeton University librarian
Bill Dix, US politician
Bill Dix (rugby union), rugby union player who represented Australia
William Dix (MP), Member of Parliament for New Shoreham
William Peirce Dix (1853–1924), English football administrator and FA Cup referee

See also
William Dick (disambiguation)